The 2021–22 Oman Quadrangular Series was a Twenty20 International (T20I) cricket tournament that took place in Oman in February 2022. The participating teams were the hosts Oman along with Ireland, Nepal and the United Arab Emirates. The series provided all four teams with preparation for the T20 World Cup Global Qualifier Group A, which began on 18 February 2022.

The opening match of the series, which was scheduled to be between Ireland and the UAE, was rescheduled after Ireland's luggage did not arrive on time. A man-of-the-match performance from Dipendra Singh Airee sealed victory for Nepal over Oman in a thrilling run chase in the surviving day one fixture. The UAE and Ireland each picked up comfortable wins on the second day of the competition, against Nepal and Oman, respectively. The UAE defeated Ireland in the rearranged fixture on day three, their third T20I win in a row against the Irish, to go into the final day at the top of the table. Oman ended the UAE's winning streak on the final day thanks to a five-wicket haul from Aamir Kaleem and a rapid 84 for Muhammad Waseem, to ensure that the champions would be decided in the final game of the tournament. The final match, between Ireland and Nepal, could have seen either side win the tournament, but Ireland's 16-run victory in a low-scoring affair was not enough to replace the UAE at the top of the standings.

Squads

Ireland also named Neil Rock and Ben White as travelling reserves. Sandeep Lamichhane captained Nepal for the first time in T20Is.

Points table

Fixtures

References

External links
 Series home at ESPN Cricinfo

Associate international cricket competitions in 2021–22
Oman Quadrangular Series